Malcolm Manley was a cultured Scottish footballer (soccer player) whose career was cruelly cut short by a crippling knee injury. Born in Johnstone on 1 December 1949 Manley gained Schoolboy international honours for Scotland before joining his hometown club Johnstone Burgh. Here he quickly caught the eye of scouts south of the border and he signed for Leicester City F.C. in January 1967. The highlights of his time at Filbert Street included being substitute in the  1969 FA Cup Final side and a 1971 Second division Championship winners Medal. He also played as a substitute when Leicester won the 1971 FA Charity Shield. In December 1973, Manley signed for Portsmouth with funds made available by ambitious new chairman John Deacon. Manager John Mortimore planned a rock-like central partnership between the Scotsman and fellow new signing Paul Went  which briefly materialised before he severed a cartilage in only his 11th game for the Fratton Park club, never to play professionally again.

Death 
Manley died on 16 August 2020, aged 70.

Notes

1949 births
People from Johnstone
Leicester City F.C. players
Portsmouth F.C. players
Living people
Johnstone Burgh F.C. players
South Melbourne FC players
English Football League players
Association football central defenders
Scotland youth international footballers
Scottish footballers
FA Cup Final players